Odair Pericles dos Ramos Jesús da Costa Baia (born 11 April 1978) is a São Tomé and Principe sprint athlete. He competed at the 1996 Summer Olympic Games in the men's 100 metres and finished ninth in his heat, failing to advance.

References

Living people
1978 births
São Tomé and Príncipe male sprinters
Olympic athletes of São Tomé and Príncipe
Athletes (track and field) at the 1996 Summer Olympics